Class 23 may refer to:

 British Rail Class 23 "Baby Deltic", diesel-electric locomotive built by English Electric with Napier Deltic engines
 L&YR Class 23, 0-6-0 steam locomotive operated by the Lancashire and Yorkshire Railway
 German express train, tender locomotives with a 2-6-2 wheel arrangement operated by the DRG, DB and DR:
 The DRG's pre-war, standard, steam locomotive (Einheitslokomotive): DRG Class 23
 The DB's post-war (Neubaulokomotive): DB Class 23
 The DR's post-war Neubaulokomotive in East Germany: DR Class 23.10